DXFA-DTV/GNN TV43 is a TV station owned by Global Satellite Technology Services and currently an affiliate of Golden Nation Network in the Philippines. Its studios and transmitter are located at Lamisahan Street, Manicahan, Zamboanga City.

History of GNN TV43 Zamboanga
GNN TV43 Zamboanga/FUBC was founded by Ma. Clara "Caling" L. Lobregat and Basilio "Bong" Apolinario II.
It brought to Zamboanga City its first FM station and its first color television station in 1977.
The television station, DWLA 9Alive, was characterized by 9 "lovely" ladies.
The network is on a massive expansion drive. 
In 1995, its original TV station, VHF channel 9 in Zamboanga city was sold to GMA.
However it operates UHF 43 in Zamboanga.
FUBC's FM station, DXLA-FM 99.5 MHz, and its AM station, DXRH-AM 1080 kHz have moved to Basilan/ARMM.
However, its present goal seems to reinvent itself in the UHF spectrum nationwide rather than expand in the radio business.
On September 6, 2021, GNN TV-43 Zamboanga became the Digital TV broadcast.

Personalities
Cathy Veloso Santillan (one of the original 9Alive Girls who became a broadcaster and NewsWatch anchor of RPN-9 in the early 1990s)
Erico Basilio "Erbie" Fabian (Zamboanga City District II Congressman)
Pal Marquez (ABS-CBN Correspondent for Western Mindanao and former anchor)

See also
Global News Network

References

Television stations in Zamboanga City
Television channels and stations established in 1977
1977 establishments in the Philippines